Kui Xing, originally called 奎星 (also kuí xīng), also known as 大魁夫子 "Great Master Kui" or 大魁星君 "Great Kui the Star Lord", is a character in Chinese religion, the Deity of Examinations, and one of the Five Gods of Literature, Wu Wen Chang.

The name 'Kui Xing' literally means "Chief Star(s)", and anciently referred to the 'spoon' of the Big Dipper.  The Chun Qiu Yun Dou Shu defines the ‘Kui Xing' as "The four stars in the first section of the dipper".  The 'handle' was referred to as the 杓 shao, or ladle/spoon.  Kui Xing's original name, 奎星, is the original name of the star in the Big Dipper located furthest from the 'handle' - Dubhe.

Folk beliefs

In Daoist tradition, Kui Xing is said to have been "bent and hunchbacked, as if he were an actual calligraphy character", and came to be viewed as a saint of human fortune, particularly with regard to imperial examinations.  Late Ming Dynasty scholar Gu Yan-Wu, often referred to as Gu Ting-Lin, wrote of Kui Xing in his Record of Historical Knowledge: "The date of the beginning of modern people's veneration of Kui Xing is unknown.  Since Kui (奎) was taken to be the master of composition, therefore the people established shrines to venerate him.  Being unable to sculpt an image of the star (奎), his name was thus changed to [the homophonous character] 魁.  Again being unable to directly construct an image of 魁, the character was split into its constituent radicals [鬼 Gui - Ghost/Spirit and 斗 Dou - Ladle/Gourd] and illustrated as such."  Gu's statement suggests the name change was a creative measure designed to facilitate Kui Xing's veneration. 

As his form developed, people depicted Kui Xing's right foot standing on a character 鰲 (ao), a giant turtle, in reference to a traditional saying, 獨佔鰲頭, "to stand lonely on the ao'''s head", meaning coming in first in examinations), his left foot support a ladle, a writing brush in his hand, and his body full of vigor and life.  Stylized calligraphy of Confucian adages often compose his torso.

Artists have also depicted the ao'' on which Kui Xing stands as a giant fish (see the image of a temple in Xinwupu, Hubei), or as a realistic-looking turtle (e.g., the statue near Bijiacheng - the "Brush-rest wall" - in Changde, Hunan).

See also
Beitun Wenchang Temple
Miaoli Wenchang Temple
Imperial examination in Chinese mythology
Legs (Chinese constellation)

Notes

External links

Kui-Xing — article from Godchecker (retrieved 1 February 2006)

Hsing, K'uei